Slag is a by-product of smelting ore.

Slag may also refer to:

Arts, entertainment, and media
 Slag (play), an early play by David Hare
 Slag (video game), a 1980 game for the TRS-80
 The Slag brothers, characters in the American animated television series Wacky Races
 Slag, the Dinobot in Transformers

Other uses
 Slag (welding), a by-product of some arc welding processes
 Slag, a pejorative British term for slut
 Slag, an alternative name for spoil tip, mining waste

See also 
 "Slag off" (Irish), see Insult comedy